Telecommunications in Yemen provides information about the telephone, Internet, radio, and television infrastructure in Yemen.

Infrastructure

Since unification in 1990, efforts have been made to create a national telecommunications network.

The infrastructure of the domestic system consists of microwave radio relay, cable, tropospheric scatter, Global System for Mobile Communications (GSM), and CDMA. Fixed-line and mobile-cellular teledensity remains low by regional standards.

The international network consists of three Intelsat (two Indian Ocean, and one Atlantic Ocean), one Intersputnik, and two Arabsat satellite earth stations, and a microwave radio relay to Saudi Arabia and Djibouti.  Yemen is a landing point for the international submarine cable Fiber-Optic Link Around the Globe (FLAG).

In 2005 TeleYemen announced it would invest in the FALCON high-capacity loop cable system, which will improve Internet access, including broadband capability, and also expand international call accessibility.

Radio and television

The state-run Republic of Yemen Television and Republic of Yemen Radio operate the country's television and radio networks, respectively. There are two state-run TV stations; two state-run national radio stations and five local stations; stations from Oman and Saudi Arabia can be accessed (2007).

Internet usage

Yemen had 2.349 million Internet users in 2011, up from 295,232 in 2008, and 270,000 in 2006. These low numbers are attributed to the high cost of computer equipment and connections in combination with the population's low level of income, as well as to the restricted bandwidth available on Yemen's outdated telephone network. There were 33,206 Internet hosts in 2012.

There are five Internet service providers in Yemen.

The top-level domain for Yemen is .ye.

Providers
TeleYemen is the exclusive provider of international telecommunications for Yemen—fixed-line and wireless mobile companies, telex, and Internet services—and is one of the mobile-phone operators. In 2003 the government-owned Public Telecommunications Corporation assumed full control of TeleYemen, and a year later it awarded a five-year management contract to France Telecom.

In 2001 two private companies won 15-year licenses to provide mobile phone services. The growth of the companies' networks has resulted in coverage of about 60 percent of the population, but threats to internal security coupled with poor consumer payment history remain obstacles to future growth. In August 2005, the government awarded a contract to a joint venture between China Mobile and a group of Yemeni investors to take a 55 percent stake in Yemen's third mobile network; the government will retain a 25 percent share. In August 2006, the same conglomerate was awarded a contract for a fourth mobile network. The four mobile network providers currently present in the mobile phone market are MTN Yemen (Spacetel Yemen until 2006), Sabafon, Yemen Mobile, and Y (Y Telecom).

See also
 Media of Yemen

References

External links
 Media and Telecommunications Lansdcape in Yemen, a infoasaid guide , February 2012, 118 pp.